The American Political Science Review is a quarterly peer-reviewed academic journal covering all areas of political science. It is an official journal of the American Political Science Association and is published on their behalf by Cambridge University Press. The journal was established in 1906. It is considered a flagship journal in political science.

Abstracting and indexing 
The journal is abstracted and indexed in the Social Sciences Citation Index, Current Contents / Social & Behavioral Sciences, International Bibliography of Periodical Literature, and the International Bibliography of Book Reviews of Scholarly Literature and Social Sciences. According to the Journal Citation Reports, the journal has a 2016 impact factor of 3.316, ranking it 5th out of 165 journals in the category "Political Science".

Editorial team 
The first three managing editors were W. W. Willoughby (1906-1916), John A. Fairlie (1917-1925) and Frederic A. Ogg (1926–1949).

For the 2020–2024 term, the journal is co-led by a 12 member editorial team of Sharon Wright Austin, Michelle Dion, Celeste Montoya, Clarissa Rile Hayward, Kelly Kadera, Julie Novkov, Valeria Sinclair-Chapman, Dara Strolovitch, Aili M. Tripp, Denise Walsh, S. Laurel Weldon, and Elisabeth Jean Wood. This team's term will last until May 2024. The editorial team noted in a publication of the American Political Science Association that, while many journals have had all-male editorial teams, many fewer political science journals have had all-woman teams.

This team follows a 2016–2020 editorial team that had been primarily based in Europe, in an attempt to globalize the reach of the American Political Science Review.

See also 
 List of political science journals

References

Further reading

External links
 
 American Political Science Review Archive at Hathitrust

1906 establishments in the United States
Academic journals associated with learned and professional societies of the United States
Cambridge University Press academic journals
English-language journals
Political science in the United States
Political science journals
Publications established in 1906
Quarterly journals